Fyling Hall is a private, co-educational day and boarding school situated near the small village of Fylingthorpe, near Robin Hood's Bay,  south east of Whitby, North Yorkshire, England. Founded in 1923 by Mab Bradley, the school was then run for thirty years by her daughter, Clare White.

History of Hall
There was a hall here in 1632 when Sir Hugh Cholmeley, 4th Baronet was born here. However the present building dates from around 1819 and is grade II listed.

Boarding Houses
There are four boarding houses at Fyling Hall:
 Woodside: Sixth Form Girls
 Ramsdale: Sixth Form Boys
 Main: Junior and Senior Girls
 Mulgrave: Junior and Senior Boys

School motto
The school motto is 'The days that make us happy make us wise' (John Masefield).

Sports
Fyling Hall School offers a wide variety of sports for all pupils.  Most important amongst these, and shaping daily life at Fyling Hall, are rugby, hockey, cross country, cricket, horse riding and rounders.

Popular culture
The main building of Fyling Hall is used in G.P Taylor's novel Shadowmancer as the vicarage of Obadiah Demurral. The vicarage is destroyed by cannon fire from Jacob Crane's smuggler ship 'The Magenta'.

Notable former pupils

 Eliza Carthy
 Michael Dickinson
 Ryan Gibson
 Philip Hayton
 Jamie Noon

Notable former teachers
 Alex Thomson

References

External links
 School Website
 Profile on the ISC website

Educational institutions established in 1923
Private schools in North Yorkshire
Boarding schools in North Yorkshire
1923 establishments in England
Member schools of the Independent Schools Association (UK)